The Saitek X52 is an advanced HOTAS Joystick/Throttle combination from Saitek released in 2004.

Features
The X52 was one of Saitek's flagship products and features both a Joystick and a Throttle. The distinguishing feature of the X52 is the large backlit blue (or green, on an X52 Pro) LCD display on the throttle, which displays the mode it is configured, the name of the button being depressed and a chronograph function. The Multi-Function Display (MFD) screen can be used to check programmed command names and use the clock and stopwatch function for timing the legs of your flight plan.

The joystick/throttle combination includes a number of controls, including trim wheels, a thumb operated slider, a mouse control and three eight-way hat switches, and a button under a flip-guard labeled "Safe". The stick includes built in yaw/rudder control, which can be disabled in the case that the user has an alternate rudder control.

The stick/throttle combination are designed to function as a HOTAS system. This means that games can be played without the player ever taking their hands off the controls to use a keyboard or mouse.

The X52 uses only a single spring mounted vertically to keep it centered, while the X52 Pro uses dual springs for stronger centering. This enables quick direction changes on the stick without "clicking" through the axes - a problem common to other sticks which normally feature two springs mounted horizontally.  The X52 also features an integrated mouse on the throttle, however it is difficult to use for making quick selections and only functions when drivers and the SST software are installed.

Featuring 23 buttons, three 8-way hat switches and 7 control axes, the X52 gives you 47 basic commands plus the control axes. But when you include the programming options provided by powerful Saitek Smart Technology programming software, which allows you to make use of the 3 position mode switch and Pinkie shift switch, the total number of programmable commands is 282.

Programming Software 
The Smart Technology (ST) programming software is used to program all kinds of behaviors for each command of the HOTAS, even custom ones such as setting not only the Pinkie switch, but just about any button to act as a shift, making it possible, then, to have multiple shift buttons configured per game Profile, which raise the total number of programmable commands far above the canon limit of 282.

The software allows gamers to configure their controls to suit their preferred gaming style and to save the configurations as personal game Profiles, which can be selected and applied on-the-fly at any time through the HOTAS itself (the MFD will list the available Profile names). The use of multiple game Profiles prepared for each game raises the amount of programmable functions per game to a virtually unlimited amount.

Support 
Since the acquisition of Saitek in September 2016, Logitech has been providing both Driver and ST programming software support for the X52 and X52 Pro HOTAS devices. Over the years, users have reported issues and stability problems regarding the use of [Logitech's] ST programming software. The old drivers and ST programming software from Saitek are still available at ftp.saitek.com (freely accessible through most ftp clients) and they still work properly today on modern operating systems, such as Windows 10.

Should the user of Logitech's driver/ST programming software decide to revert to the Saitek's counterparts, a complete removal of the Logitech drivers/ST programming software plus all related X52 peripherals installed in the System would be mandatory, lest the Saitek version of the ST programming software would fail to recognize and communicate with the HOTAS on account of different Hardware IDs set by the driver from Logitech. To successfully use the ST programming software from Saitek is necessary to also use the companion driver from Saitek.

Joystick
 Precision centering mechanism, non-contact technology on X and Y axes and constant spring force reduce free play, improve control and increase durability.
 Two-stage metal trigger; two primary buttons in one convenient position
 Four fire buttons including missile launcher with spring-loaded safety cover for instant access
 Conveniently positioned metal pinkie switch provides shift functionality to double up on programmable commands
 Two X eight-way hat switches
 3D rudder twist
 Three-position rotary mode selector switch with LED indicators
 Three spring-loaded, base-mounted toggle switches for up to six programmable flight commands
 Five-position handle adjustment system to suit all hand sizes

Throttle
 Progressive throttle with tension adjustment, and two detents for afterburner and idle (set at 90% and 10% respectively)
 Two fire buttons
 Scroll wheel with built-in button
 Mouse controller / hat switch with left mouse button
 Eight-way hat switch
 Two x rotary controls
 Smooth-action slider control
 Clutch button initiates ‘safe mode’ to allow on-the-fly Profile selection, or to display button functionality without activating

References

External links
Saitek.com

Home computer peripherals
Game controllers